"Things Are Tough All Over" is a song recorded by American country music artist Shelby Lynne. It was released in September 1990 as the second single from her album Tough All Over.  The song peaked at number 23 on the Billboard Hot Country Singles & Tracks chart and reached number 19 on the RPM Country Tracks chart in Canada.

Chart performance

References

1990 singles
Shelby Lynne songs
Epic Records singles
Songs written by Trey Bruce
Song recordings produced by Bob Montgomery (songwriter)
1990 songs